Carol Jean Mountford (née Newton; born 12 January 1954) is a British Labour Party politician who served as the Member of Parliament (MP) for Colne Valley from 1997 until she retired from the House of Commons at the 2010 general election.

Early life
Mountford was born in Crewe, the daughter of an engine driver. She attended Crewe Grammar School for Girls (became King's Grove High School in the late 1970s and The Oaks Academy in 2016) on Buchan Grove in Crewe. In 1986, whilst working at the Crewe Jobcentre, she stood as the Liberal candidate in a County Council bye-election in Crewe Central ward on 18 September. At Crewe and Alsager College (now the Alsager Campus of Manchester Metropolitan University), she obtained a DipHE and a BA in Philosophy, Psychology and Sociology in 1988 as a mature student. Mountford served as a Sheffield City Councillor for four years and worked as a civil servant benefits clerk for 10 years then a researcher and training officer for further 10 years prior to entering Parliament. She was also active in the CPSA (became the PCS in 1998) also joint membership with IPCS Institute of Professional and Civil Servants as regional and national officer.

Parliamentary career
Mountford was selected as a Labour candidate through an all-women shortlist.  She was first elected at the 1997 general election for Colne Valley and served as Parliamentary Private Secretary to Des Browne MP.

She retired from the Commons at the 2010 general election. The Colne Valley seat was then won by the Conservative Party candidate, Jason McCartney. Although Labour fell to third place that election, they would regain the seat seven years later.

Controversies
Mountford was suspended from the House of Commons for five working days in 1998 for leaking a Social Security Select Committee report to the government. The House of Commons Standards and Privileges Committee stated that although there were some mitigating circumstances for her behaviour, she had in fact "aggravated her original offence by denying responsibility". In addition to the suspension Mountford was forced to apologise for her conduct.

As a result of the controversy Mountford also resigned from the Social Security Select Committee.

Personal life
Mountford married her third husband Ian Leedham in July 1995 in Sheffield; she has a son and daughter.

References

External links
 Kali Mountford MP's official website 
 Guardian Unlimited Politics - Ask Aristotle: Kali Mountford MP
 TheyWorkForYou.com - Kali Mountford MP
 BBC Politics

News items
 Textile industry in December 2002
 Suspended from Select Committee in October 1999

Audio clips
 Apology in July 1999

1954 births
Living people
Labour Party (UK) MPs for English constituencies
Female members of the Parliament of the United Kingdom for English constituencies
UK MPs 1997–2001
UK MPs 2001–2005
UK MPs 2005–2010
Councillors in Sheffield
Alumni of Manchester Metropolitan University
People from Crewe
Labour Party (UK) councillors
20th-century British women politicians
21st-century British women politicians
20th-century English women
20th-century English people
21st-century English women
21st-century English people
Women councillors in England